Kiril Petkov Petkov (born 17 April 1980) is a Bulgarian politician, economist, and entrepreneur, who served as Prime Minister of Bulgaria from December 2021 to August 2022. He is the co-leader of We Continue the Change, a political party he co-founded with Asen Vasilev.

Early life and education 
Petkov was born on 17 April 1980, in Plovdiv. He holds a Bachelor of Commerce degree in finance from the University of British Columbia in Vancouver and a Master of Business Administration degree from Harvard University, where he was ranked in the top 10% of his class. One of his lecturers was Michael Porter, with whom he specialized in the development of cluster strategies. Petkov is one of the founders of the Center for Economic Strategies and Competitiveness at Sofia University, affiliated with Harvard University, where he has taught classes in economic development and microeconomics of competitiveness.

Business career 
From 2001 to 2005, Petkov worked for the Canadian food company McCain Foods as a corporate development manager. Since 2007, he has been developing projects in the field of high value-added innovation, and his company ProViotik holds several patents in biotechnology in the United States.

Political career

Early political career 
On 11 January 2017, Petkov was elected in the executive board of the newly formed political party Yes, Bulgaria!

Minister of Economy 
From 12 May to 16 September 2021, Petkov served as Minister of Economy in the caretaker government of Stefan Yanev. In his first television appearance as a minister, Petkov revealed that the Bulgarian Development Bank, controlled by the state and purported to support small and medium-sized enterprises, had distributed 500 million euros in loans to just eight companies owned by four businessmen. He condemned the practice as 'outrageous' and initiated an audit of how loans had been allocated.

Prime Minister of Bulgaria

Prelude
On 19 September 2021, Petkov and Asen Vasilev presented their political project We Continue the Change (PP), an anti-corruption party seeking to be the uniting force that could bring all the other like-minded parties together to form a government. The pair met while studying at Harvard Business School.

On 27 October 2021, the Constitutional Court of Bulgaria retroactively overturned the decree appointing Petkov as Minister of Economy due to his status as a dual citizen, as the Constitution of Bulgaria states that ministers must only be Bulgarian citizens. Although the position was retracted from him, his actions in the role were not nullified. Political opponents of Petkov which included Lozan Panov, a presidential candidate and chairman of the Supreme Court of Cassation of Bulgaria, called for action to be taken on the issue. Petkov was previously a citizen of Canada, and stated that he had renounced his citizenship in April 2021, but Canadian government documents showed that the procedure was not officially completed until August 2021.

After the initial results of the November elections were released, where PP came first but with a minority of 67 from 240 seats, Petkov announced that the party would be seeking to come to an agreement with several of the other parliamentary represented parties, and that he would be willing to partner up with all parties that would join the fight against corruption in Bulgaria. Petkov said he wanted to pursue "transparent" coalition negotiations with Democratic Bulgaria (DB) and There Is Such a People (ITN), and that he would be PP's nomination for prime minister. The Movement for Rights and Freedoms (DPS) and GERB were not included in the coalition talks.

A series of talks on 18 policy areas were held between 23 November and 27 November, between the representatives of PP, the Bulgarian Socialist Party (BSP), ITN and DB. On 10 December, the leaders of the four parties confirmed that they had reached a coalition agreement, and would form Bulgaria's first regular government since April. Shortly after, President Rumen Radev announced that he had given the mandate to form a government to Petkov. On 12 December, Petkov presented the composition of the incoming government, which was approved by the National Assembly on 13 December 2021.

In office
Petkov was elected prime minister of Bulgaria in the Parliament of Bulgaria on 13 December 2021, with 134 votes in favour and 104 against, and his new government was appointed on the same day by President Rumen Radev.

In the first week following the 2022 Russian invasion of Ukraine, Petkov announced that Bulgaria would welcome Ukrainian refugees. He stated, "These are not the refugees we are used to; these people are Europeans. These people are intelligent. They are educated people...This is not the refugee wave we have been used to, people we were not sure about their identity, people with unclear pasts, who could have been even terrorists." His statement drew widespread criticism and allegations of racism, with many highlighting the different treatment of past refugee waves.

In February, Petkov called for the resignation of Stefan Yanev from his position as Minister of Defense, after Yanev declined to use the word "war" in reference to Russia’s invasion of Ukraine, instead referring to it as a "special operation", echoing language used by Russian President Vladimir Putin. In May, Petkov recalled Bulgaria's ambassador to Russia, after Russian ambassador to Bulgaria Eleonora Mitrofanova drew a comparison between the war in Ukraine and Bulgaria's liberation from the Ottoman Empire.

 
On 19 March, Petkov was joined by US Secretary of Defense Lloyd J. Austin to announce that the Port of Varna and Port of Constanța would be joined by road and railroad connections as well as by energy infrastructure, in an effort to increase military mobility in the region. He said: "There will be a bridge over the Danube River... Logistics is just as important as military equipment... We can have really a working defense along the eastern flank [of NATO]."

In early 2022, Petkov was sympathetic to the repeated requests of Volodymyr Zelensky for military aid in Ukraine's battle against Russia, but he faced the refusal of Bulgarian Socialist Party and the party's leader Korneliya Ninova. On 4 May, the parliament approved the continuation of repairs for damaged Ukrainian military equipment, and announced that Bulgaria would continue to support Ukraine's membership in the EU, as well as Ukrainian refugees, who numbered more than 56,000 as of 7 June. Petkov noted Bulgaria's espousal of all sanctions against Russia, and would allow the use of the Port of Varna to transship goods that had been stifled by the Russian blockade of Odesa.

In early June, Petkov's coalition partner, There Is Such a People, which had called for energy cooperation with Russia even after Gazprom cut off supplies to Bulgaria, withdrew from the coalition. On 22 June, the government faced a motion of no confidence, which it lost. Petkov formally resigned from his position as prime minister on 27 June, and was tasked by President Rumen Radev to form a new government.

In the evening of 27 June, the Russian embassy in Sofia launched a charity appeal for Bulgarians to support the Russian invasion of Ukraine. One day later, Petkov announced the expulsion of 70 Russian diplomats over concerns of espionage. The Ministry of Foreign Affairs announced that Bulgaria would be temporarily closing down its diplomatic mission in Yekaterinburg and expected Russia to temporarily halt the activities of its own mission in Ruse, Bulgaria.

Petkov's coalition collapsed in June 2022 after his government lost a vote of no confidence. He left office on 2 August and was succeeded by the former minister of labor Galab Donev, who leads a caretaker government. President Radev subsequently called for a snap election to be held on 2 October.

References

External links

Profile at Ministry of Economy, Bulgaria

|-

|-

1980 births
Living people
Bulgarian politicians
Harvard Business School alumni
People from Plovdiv
Economy ministers of Bulgaria
Prime Ministers of Bulgaria
University of British Columbia alumni